Sincerely Yours... is a 1985 Soviet comedy film directed by Alla Surikova.

Plot 
The film tells about a young employee of the observatory, who is looking for a new lens and dedicated his life to this. Only earthly love can stop him.

Cast 
 Vitali Solomin as Pasha Dobrynin
 Vera Glagoleva as Katya
 Viktor Ilichyov as Yura
 Rolan Bykov as Postnikov
 Armen Dzhigarkhanyan as Serafimov
 Larisa Udovichenko as Lusya
 Nikolay Parfyonov as Novikov
 Leonid Kuravlyov as Emtsov
 Irina Shmeleva as Lena
 Elena Sanaeva as Baba-Yaga

References

External links 
 

1985 films
1980s Russian-language films
Soviet comedy films
1985 comedy films